Jung Eun-ji (born Jeong Hye-rim, on August 18, 1993), better known mononymously as Eunji, is a South Korean singer, songwriter, actress, radio DJ, musical actress, and voice actress. She is best known as a member of the South Korean girl group Apink. Jung made her acting debut in the coming-of-age drama, Reply 1997 in 2012. She has since had roles in That Winter, the Wind Blows (2013), Trot Lovers (2014), Cheer Up! (2015), Untouchable (2017), Work Later, Drink Now (2021–2022) and Blind (2022) in addition to various voice acting roles. She released her debut solo album, Dream, in 2016.

Early life and education
Jung Eun-ji was born as Jeong Hye-rim in Haeundae, Busan on August 18, 1993. Her name was legally changed to Jung Eun-ji when she was in middle school. She has a younger brother named Jung Min-ki. She attended Hapdo Kindergarten, Shinjae Elementary School, Jaesong Girls' Middle School and Hyehwa Girls' High School. In 2004, Jung won the first place prize in the program Exciting Day Enjoyable Day hosted by the KBS network. In November 2010, Jung passed the auditions to become the main singer of Apink. She had not received any professional training prior to joining Apink, and had trained for only two months with the group.

Music career

Apink

In March 2011, Jung was revealed to be the fourth member of Apink via an online video of her covering Jennifer Hudson's "Love You I Do". Jung joined with the rest of the group to film Apink News prior to debut. On April 21, 2011, Jung made her debut as a main vocalist of Apink on Mnet's M Countdown with two songs, "Mollayo" and "Wishlist", from the debut extended play Seven Springs of Apink.

Solo works
Jung has collaborated with various artists for OSTs and promotional songs. For the project A Cube for Season #Green, Jung Eun-ji and fellow Cube artist Yang Yo-seob, sang the duet track "Love Day". In August 2012, Jung recorded two promotional singles, "All For You" and "Our Love Like This" with Reply 1997 co-star Seo In-guk for the drama's soundtrack. "All For You" became one of the best-selling singles of the year on the Gaon Single Chart.

In 2013 and 2014, Jung collaborated with label-mate Huh Gak for duets titled "Short Hair" and "Break Up To Make Up" respectively, which were well received by listeners and ranked atop major online music charts in Korea. She released her first solo single titled "Its You" for the soundtrack of Three Days.

On April 18, 2016, Jung debuted as a solo artist with the EP Dream, which consisted of 6 songs. The title song "Hopefully Sky" is written by Jung, which recounts the times she spent with her father. "Hopefully Sky" topped eight local music charts, and the album sold 30,000 copies upon release.

In April 2017, Jung released her second EP The Space. The title track, "The Spring" and its accompanying music video was unveiled on 10 April, and debuted within the top ten spots on local music charts. From 3 to 5 June 2017, Jung held her first solo concert titled "Attic" at Ewha Womans University's Samsung Hall.

On October 18, 2018, Jung released a music video for the single "Being There", from her third EP Hyehwa.

On July 15, 2020, Jung released her fourth EP Simple, along with the title track "AWay".

On October 30, 2022, IST Entertainment Announced that the release of the remake album Log, which was originally scheduled to be released on November 2, has been postponed to November 11 due to the aftermath of the Seoul Halloween crowd crush.On November 17, 2022, IST Entertainment It has been announced that Jung will be holding solo concerts Travelog on December 10 and 11.

Acting career

Jung made her acting debut in Reply 1997, a 1990s nostalgic dramedy which became one of the highest-rated Korean series on cable television. She played the female protagonist, a hardcore H.O.T. fan who becomes a TV drama writer. Jung was complimented by critics and audiences for her comedic and emotional acting, which was impressive for a newcomer, as well as for her authentic Busan dialect. The role won her several awards, including the 49th Baeksang Arts Award for Best New TV Actress.

Jung performed in a Korean staging of the Hollywood film-turned-musical Legally Blonde, playing the lead role of Elle Woods. The show ran from November 16, 2012, to March 17, 2013.

Jung was then cast in a supporting role in the 2013 melodrama That Winter, the Wind Blows. For her role, she won Best Performance at the 2nd APAN Star Awards and New Star Award at the SBS Drama Awards.

In 2014, she starred in another musical, the stage adaptation of 2004 series Full House. Afterwards, Jung starred in the romantic comedy series Trot Lovers, which depicts a female singer's struggles to become successful in the old-fashioned musical genre trot.

In 2015, Jung starred as the female lead in KBS2 high school drama Cheer Up! playing the role of a high school student who ranks at the bottom of her class.

In 2017, Jung was cast in JTBC's action melodrama Untouchable which began airing on November 24.

In 2018, Jung was cast in the horror film 0.0MHz, based on the webtoon of the same name.

In 2020, Jung was cast in the musical Natasha, Pierre & the Great Comet of 1812.

In 2021, Jung was cast in TVING's web series Work Later, Drink Now as Kang Ji-goo, an origami YouTuber. The series premiered at the Cannes International Series Festival 2022 from April 1 to April 6, 2022.

In 2022, she starred in the mystery thriller television series Blind, portraying the role of a social worker.

Discography

Extended plays

Singles

Soundtrack appearances

Other charted songs

Composition credits
All song credits are adapted from the Korea Music Copyright Association's database unless stated otherwise.

Videography

Music videos

Filmography

Films

Television series

Web series

Television show

Radio show

Hosting

Theatre

Concerts and tours

The Attic (1st Concert)

Hyehwa Station (2nd Concert)

Yeoreum (3rd Concert)

Online Concert : How To Live (2020)

Travelog (4rd Concert)

Awards and nominations

Notes

References

External links

 
 

1993 births
Living people
21st-century South Korean actresses
Apink members
Japanese-language singers of South Korea
People from Busan
South Korean dance musicians
South Korean women pop singers
Mezzo-sopranos
South Korean mezzo-sopranos
South Korean female idols
South Korean television actresses
South Korean television personalities
South Korean web series actresses
MAMA Award winners
IST Entertainment artists
Melon Music Award winners